Saúl García Ávila (born 7 June 1986) is a Mexican former footballer, who last played as a winger for Mexican side Mérida in the Primera División.

Club career
García started his career in the Chivas de Guadalajara youth systems. After playing for Chivas' Primera Division A teams for two seasons, he was traded to Pegaso Real Colima, the former filial team for Atlante, where he made it to the semifinal in the Clausura 2007 tournament. After playing two seasons for Club Tijuana, he rejoined Atlante's system by signing with their new filial, Potros Chetumal.

He made his professional debut on April 26, 2009, during a 1–0 loss to CF Monterrey. He started the game and played 67 minutes.

References

External links
 
Profile at BDFA

1986 births
Living people
Sportspeople from León, Guanajuato
Footballers from Guanajuato
Association football midfielders
Mexican footballers
Club Tijuana footballers
Club León footballers
Atlante F.C. footballers
La Piedad footballers
C.F. Mérida footballers
Liga MX players